Ivan Tolić (born 13 March 1996) is a Croatian male canoeist who won two medals at senior level at the Wildwater Canoeing World Championships.

Medals at the World Championships
Senior

References

External links
 

1996 births
Living people
Croatian male canoeists
Place of birth missing (living people)